Goodenia rupestris, commonly known as rock hand-flower, is a species of flowering plant in the family Goodeniaceae and is endemic to the Northern Territory section of the Petermann Ranges. It is an ascending or pendulous perennial herb with crowded elliptic to lance-shaped leaves with the narrower end towards the base, and racemes of yellow flowers.

Description

Taxonomy and naming
Goodenia rupestris was first formally described in 1980 by Roger Charles Carolin in the journal Telopea from material he collected between the Hull and Docker Rivers in the Petermann Ranges in 1966. The specific epithet (rupestris) means "rocky".

Distribution and habitat
This goodenia grows in crevices on cliffs in the Northern Territory part of the Petermann Ranges.

Conservation status
Goodenia rupestris is classified as "data deficient" under the Northern Territory Government Territory Parks and Wildlife Conservation Act 1976.

References

rupestris
Flora of the Northern Territory
Plants described in 1980
Taxa named by Roger Charles Carolin
Endemic flora of Australia